Aquilino Gomes Ribeiro, ComL (13 September 1885 – 27 May 1963, Lisbon), was a Portuguese writer and diplomat. He is generally considered to be one of the great Portuguese novelists of the 20th century.

Biography
Born in Carregal de Tabosa, Sernancelhe, the natural son of Joaquim Francisco Ribeiro, a priest, and Mariana do Rosário Gomes, he had three older siblings: Maria do Rosário, Melchior and Joaquim. He was originally destined for the priesthood, but became involved with the Portuguese Republican Party in opposition to the Royal House of Braganza, and had to exile himself in Paris. In 1914, he returned to Portugal, after the start of World War I. By then, the Portuguese First Republic had been established.

He was later involved in opposition to António de Oliveira Salazar and the Estado Novo, whose government had moved to censor or ban several of his books.

He was married twice: in 1913 to Grete Tiedemann (ca. 1890-1927), a German, by whom he had a son, Aníbal Aquilino Fritz Tiedeman Ribeiro in 1914; then, in 1929, to Jerónima Dantas Machado, daughter of the deposed President of Portugal Bernardino Machado, by whom he had a son Aquilino Ribeiro Machado, in 1930, who became the 60th Mayor of Lisbon (1977–1979).

Novels 

 A via sinuosa (1918)
 Terras do demo (1919)
 Filhas da Babilónia (1920)
 Andam faunos pelos bosques (1926)
 O homem que matou o diabo (1930)
 A batalha sem fim (1932)
 As três mulheres de Sansão (1932)
 Maria Benigna (1933)
 Aventura maravilhosa (1936)
 São Bonaboião: anacoreta e mártir (1937)
 Mónica (1939)
 O servo de Deus e a casa roubada (1941)
 Volfrâmio (1943)
 Lápides partidas (1945)
 Caminhos errados (1947)
 O arcanjo negro (1947)
 Humildade gloriosa  (1954)
 A Casa Grande de Romarigães (1957)
 Quando os lobos uivam (1958)
 in English: When the Wolves Howl, translated by Patricia McGowan Pinheiro (1963)
 A mina de diamantes (1958)
 Arcas encoiradas (1962)
 Casa do escorpião (1963)

References

1885 births
1963 deaths
People from Sernancelhe
Portuguese male novelists
Portuguese anti-fascists
Portuguese diplomats
20th-century novelists
20th-century male writers